"Vem Dançar Kuduro" is a multilingual Portuguese/English dance hit single by Lucenzo, a France-based artist of Portuguese origin featuring France-based American artist Big Ali.
Lucenzo sings in Portuguese and Big Ali in English.

"Vem Dançar Kuduro" (kuduro being an Angolan type of music) enjoyed much success in France, with the single "Vem Dançar Kuduro" reaching number 2 in the SNEP French Top 100 charts (based solely on actual sales of singles) and number 1 on the French Club 40 charts (based on actual plays in 80 discos in France). "Vem Dançar Kuduro" was also a hit in Denmark, Finland, Netherlands, Norway, Sweden and Switzerland. Many popular remix versions of the song have been made since.

Following the success of the song, Don Omar released with Lucenzo a Spanish-language single "Danza Kuduro" that samples on a large part on "Vem Dançar Kuduro", but is a distinct song. At times, both versions have appeared separately on the same chart in certain European countries. These include Belgium, Canada, Denmark, Finland, France, Germany, Norway, Sweden and Switzerland where both songs were hits.

Track list
Vem Dançar Kuduro (radio edit) (3:21)
Vem Dançar Kuduro (Lucenzo solo) (2:48)
Vem Dançar Kuduro (club extended)

Music video
The music video was shot in Havana, Cuba portraying Lucenzo and Big Ali promoting their concert that is to be held in a poor neighborhood in the Cuban capital, while Lucenzo is distributing posters to the public and Big Ali is joining in declaring, through loud speakers, about music coming from New York City, Angola and Portugal alluding to kuduro music to be played at the party. Some fans are joining in the celebrations dancing in the streets with the artists.

In other scenes, Lucenzo and Big Ali are seen preparing for the concert having haircuts at a barber shop.

Chart performance

Versions involving Lucenzo

Vem Dançar Kuduro / Danza Kuduro

This was a special double A side release in the Netherlands that included Lucenzo as main singer and featuring Big Ali as in the original release regarding side A (Vem Dançar Kuduro) and Don Omar regarding side B (Danza Kuduro).

Another difference for the Dutch release was that "Danza Kuduro" was credited directly to Lucenzo featuring Don Omar, whereas in all other markets, the song had been credited as "Don Omar featuring Lucenzo".

This double A side release topped the Dutch Top 40 charts.

CD Maxi:
Danza Kuduro – Lucenzo feat. Don Omar (3:20)
Vem dançar kuduro (Radio Edit) – Lucenzo feat. Big Ali (3:16)

Charts

Throw Your Hands Up (Dançar Kuduro)

"Throw Your Hands Up (Dançar Kuduro)" is a rearranged multilingual recording of the song by Qwote featuring Pitbull and Lucenzo in English, Spanish and Portuguese. It entered the UK Singles Chart at No. 13 on the chart dated 6 November 2011. It also charted on the Scottish Singles Chart, peaking at No. 11, and also charted in Ireland and Australia.

Chart performance

Year-end charts

BPI certified silver

Track list

Other versions
Qwote has released a number of other versions over and above the ones on the maxi-single as follows:
"Throw Your Hands Up (Dançar Kuduro)" – Lucenzo & Qwote (featuring Pitbull & Don Omar)
"Throw Your Hands Up (Dançar Kuduro)" – Lucenzo vs Qwote (featuring Pitbull )
"Throw Your Hands Up" – Qwote (featuring Pitbull)
"Throw Your Hands Up" – Qwote (featuring Pitbull & T-Vice)
"Throw Your Hands Up (Dançar Kuduro)" Remixed – Qwote (featuring Pitbull & Lucenzo)
"Throw Your Hands Up (Dançar Kuduro)" – Qwote (featuring Pitbull)

Danza Kuduro (Throw Your Hands Up)

"Danza Kuduro (Throw Your Hands Up)" is a rearranged multilingual recording of the song by Lucenzo and Qwote featuring Pitbull and Don Omar in English, Spanish and with a refrain by Lucenzo in Portuguese.

Other versions and samplings
In 2011, Brazilian singer Latino made a full Portuguese version of the song.

This song was also covered by Brazilian artists Robson Moura and Lino Krizz as "Vem Dançar com Tudo", as the opening for the telenovela Avenida Brasil.

Dr. Bellido sampled part of the music in his hit "Señorita" that features also the vocals of Papa Joe.

Other remixes
 Official Remix (featuring Lucenzo, Daddy Yankee & Arcangel)
 Worldwide Remix (featuring Lucenzo, Pitbull & El Cata)
 Dançar Coturo by Lika (featuring Lucenzo & Don Omar)
 Remix (featuring Lucenzo & Shakira)
 Remix (featuring Lucenzo & Erick Right)
 Raaban Remix
 Miami Power96 remix (Lucenzo, Pitbull, DJ Laz)
 Remix (featuring Lucenzo & Omari Ferrai)
 Throw Your Hands Up (Lucenzo & Qwote featuring Pitbull) - See below
 English remix (featuring Lucenzo & Dabbs)
 Merengue remix (featuring Lucenzo & El Cata)
 Remix (Lucenzo & Don Miguelo)
 Miki Hernandez Remix
 Mammat Riivaa (Ruudolf & Karri Koira)
 Danza Kuduro (Sexy Ladies) - Don Omar and Akon
 Danza Rabiosa Kuduro - DJ Ryxen Remix (featuring Lucenzo, Shakira, Pitbull, Marc Anthony & The Swedish House Maffia)
 "Viata e dura (Imnul repetentului la Bac)" - comedian version by Romanian singers
 "My Edem v Leto" - Russian version by Muradiks feat. Bahtiyar

References

External links
"Vem dançar kuduro" page on aCharts.us website
 
Lucenzo official website
 

2010 singles
Lucenzo songs
Number-one singles in Sweden
2009 songs
Pitbull (rapper) songs
Macaronic songs
Portuñol songs
Don Omar songs
Qwote songs
Songs written for films
Number-one singles in Austria
Number-one singles in Germany
Number-one singles in Italy
Dutch Top 40 number-one singles
Number-one singles in Romania
Number-one singles in Spain
Number-one singles in Switzerland
Record Report Top Latino number-one singles
Machete Music singles
Songs written by Don Omar
2010 songs
Songs written by Lucenzo